The Swedish Blue or Blue Swedish is a Swedish breed of domestic duck. It emerged during the nineteenth century in what was then Swedish Pomerania, located in present-day north-east Germany.

History 

The Swedish Blue emerged during the nineteenth century in what was then Swedish Pomerania, now located in north-east Germany; the first documented mention is from 1835. Some birds were exported to the United States in 1884, and it was added to the Standard of Perfection of the American Poultry Association in 1904 as the "Swedish", with the single color variety "blue".

The population of the Swedish Blue in Sweden consists of only 148 breeding birds; its conservation status worldwide was listed as "critical" by the Food and Agriculture Organization of the United Nations in 2007 and in 2014 was listed as "endangered-maintained" in Sweden. No data is reported from Ireland, the only other country reporting the breed. It is listed as "watch" by the American Livestock Breeds Conservancy. The Blue Swedish is not a popular exhibition breed either; specifics on wing color make the breed challenging to perfect and often discourage breeders and hobbyists from owning the breed.

Characteristics 

Swedish ducks are regularly compared to the body type of Cayugas and Orpingtons, however Swedish should have shorter bodies with more width compared to what is seen in those two breeds. Blue Swedish have medium, oval-shaped heads. Color should be a consistent blue-slate with darker lacing around the border of each feather. Drakes are generally darker than ducks. The only part of the birds that is not some variety of blue is the white, heart-shaped bib found on the breast, extending up the front of the neck terminating towards the mandible of the bird. It is distinguished from the Pomeranian Duck by its white primaries.

The blue color is due to heterozygosity in a dilution gene. As in other blue poultry such as the Blue Andalusian breed of chicken, if a two blue birds are bred, the young are, in the usual Mendelian proportion:
 25%: a homozygous form, black where the blue should be
 50%: heterozygous, the typical blue
 25%: the other homozygous form, splashed or silver with combinations of blue and black and white.
Thus only 50% of the offspring of a blue-blue mating are blue. If the black and splash homozygous forms are bred together, the offspring are all heterozygous and thus the desired blue color.

Use 

Ducks lay some 100–150 white or tinted eggs per year of  weight.

References 

Duck breeds
Duck breeds originating in Germany
Conservation Priority Breeds of the Livestock Conservancy